Gaius Claudius Pulcher  may refer to:
 Gaius Claudius Pulcher (consul 177 BC), consul in 177 BC
 Gaius Claudius Pulcher (consul 130 BC), consul in 130 BC
 Gaius Claudius Pulcher (consul 92 BC), consul in 92 BC